Johannes Frederick “Mannie” Heymans (born 15 July 1971) is a Namibian cyclist. He was born in Krugersdorp, South Africa.

Personal
Heymans moved to Namibia in 1984 while the country was still occupied by his native South Africa. A rugby player until then, Heymans began cycling in 1987.

International
Heymans has represented Namibia numerous times, including at the 1991, 1995, 1999 and 2003 All-Africa Games. He also competed for his country at the 1994, 1998, 2002 and 2006 Commonwealth Games. As for the Summer Olympics, Heymans has participated in the 2000, 2004 and 2008 Summer Olympics. In the 2008 games, Heymans was the country's flag-bearer at the opening ceremonies. Heymans won the inaugural Transalp Mountain Bike stage race in 1998 and then the first Absa Cape Epic in 2004.

References

External links
 Official web site

External links

1971 births
White Namibian people
White South African people
Namibian Afrikaner people
Living people
People from Krugersdorp
Namibian people of South African descent
Namibian male cyclists
Cyclists at the 2000 Summer Olympics
Cyclists at the 2004 Summer Olympics
Cyclists at the 2008 Summer Olympics
Olympic cyclists of Namibia
Cyclists at the 1994 Commonwealth Games
Cyclists at the 1998 Commonwealth Games
Cyclists at the 2002 Commonwealth Games
Cyclists at the 2006 Commonwealth Games
Commonwealth Games competitors for Namibia
Cape Epic winners
Sportspeople from Gauteng
Competitors at the 1991 All-Africa Games
Competitors at the 1995 All-Africa Games
Competitors at the 1999 All-Africa Games
Competitors at the 2003 All-Africa Games
African Games competitors for Namibia